John Malvern (died 1442) was a Canon of Windsor from 1408 to 1416.

Career

He was appointed:
Rector of St Dunstan-in-the-East 1402 - 1422
Prebendary of Chamberlainwood in St Paul's 1406 - 1422
Warden of the Free Chapel of St Mary, Jesmond, Newcastle upon Tyne 1416 - 1421

He was appointed to the third stall in St George's Chapel, Windsor Castle in 1408 and held the canonry until 1416.

Notes 

1442 deaths
Canons of Windsor
Year of birth unknown